Protoceras ('first horns') is an extinct genus of Artiodactyla, of the family Protoceratidae, endemic to North America.

Morphology
Like some other protoceratids it had three pairs of blunt horns on its skull. In life these were probably covered with skin, much like the ossicones of a giraffe. Protoceras was sexually dimorphic: females only had one pair of horns, on the back of the skull, which was shorter than the same pair in males. Males probably used these horns for display, impressing females, or intimidating rivals. Due to the orientation of the horns the males probably displayed them sideways instead of frontally.

Protoceras was one of the earliest and most primitive protoceratids, still possessing upper incisors and four functional toes (later genera had only two functional, hooved toes). It lived in the deserts of the Late Oligocene, alongside the oreodont Leptauchenia.

References

Protoceratids
Oligocene even-toed ungulates
Miocene even-toed ungulates
Oligocene mammals of North America
Miocene mammals of North America
Aquitanian genus extinctions
White River Fauna
Rupelian genus first appearances
Taxa named by Othniel Charles Marsh
Fossil taxa described in 1891
Prehistoric even-toed ungulate genera